Stephany Uy-Tan (born August 28, 1983) is a Filipina politician who served as mayor of Catbalogan, Samar for two consecutive terms.

Early life 
Tan was born in Catbalogan, Samar to then-Catbalogan Mayor now Vice Mayor Coefredo “Tekwa” Uy.

She attended her elementary days in Catbalogan I Central Elementary School and spent her high school life at Samar National High School. She pursued her degree in college at Saint Mary’s College of Catbalogan.

Political career 
Tan started her political career when she ran for the position of councilor of Catbalogan. After the term of her father as city mayor, she ran in mayoralty position and won tagging her as the first lady mayor in the history of the city bearing “STEP FORWARD Catbalogan City!” as brand of her leadership. After her term, she was re-elected as councilor.

Controversies

6-Month preventive suspension 
In 2018, the Department of the Interior and Local Government (DILG) upon the directive of Ombudsman of the Philippines served a 6-month preventive suspension order to former Mayor Stephany Uy-Tan, Vice Mayor Art Sherwin Gabon, 7 city councilors, and 3 city hall employees in connection with the Catbalogan government's alleged overpriced purchase of a 5.8-hectare property. The plunder allegation was filed by Bernard Jake Ramos, an employee of the Catbalogan mayor’s office. The DILG designated Councilor Archie Fuentes as acting mayor, and Councilor Kendall Perez, as acting vice mayor during the hearing of the case.

Graft allegation from typhoon victims 
On 2017, Tan was accused of allegedly changing the Typhoon Ruby (Hagupit) victims' categories from "totally damaged houses" to "partially damaged houses", therefore cutting in half the monetary assistance. Victims with totally damaged homes were supposed to receive P16,000 each, however, complainants alleged that their local government changed the category and instead distributed only P8,000 each.

Affair with Cebu City Mayor Rama 
Tan was linked to Ex-Mayor now Cebu City Vice Mayor Michael Rama for alleged love affair with him. It was all started when Rama made time to fly to attend the State of the City Address (SOCA) of Tan in Catbalogan.

Uy-Tan political dynasty 
Tan is the daughter of Ex-Mayor, later City Vice Mayor, Coefredo “Tekwa” Uy and sister of incumbent Catbalogan mayor Dexter Uy.

She is the wife of former Samar Vice Governor Stephen James “Jimboy” Tan, the brother of Samar Ex-Governor now 2nd Legislative District of Samar Congresswoman Sharee Ann Tan and Samar Governor Reynolds Michael Tan and son of the late 2nd Legislative District of Samar Congresswoman Milagrosa Tan who sought a seat in the provincial board in year 1998 to replace her brother-in-law Ruben Tan, who was in turn a substitute for her late husband, Ricardo Tan.

Personal life 
Tan is married to Samar 1st District Representative Stephen James "Jimboy" Tan. They have two daughters.

References 

Catbalogan
Filipino political people
21st-century Filipino women politicians
21st-century Filipino politicians
Politicians from Samar (province)
1983 births
Living people